Advantica may refer to:
 Advantica Restaurant Group, U.S. post-1997 parent of Denny's
 Advantica (UK),  oil and gas company, since 2007 part of GL Noble Denton

See also
 Advantic, a Slovak amateur-built aircraft (Aerospool WT10)